Fedele Rubagotti (born 9 January 1940) is an Italian racing cyclist. He rode in the 1962 Tour de France.

References

1940 births
Living people
Italian male cyclists
Place of birth missing (living people)